Henry Popham, Esq. ( 1349 – 17 June 1418) was an English landowner and Member of Parliament. 

He was a younger son of Sir John Popham of Popham, Hampshire whom he eventually succeeded to the Manor of Buckland. He served on a number of local commissions and was appointed High Sheriff of Hampshire for 1388–89. He also served as JP. He was elected Member of Parliament seven times for Hampshire in 1383, 1385, 1388 (twice), 1390, 1394 and 1404.

Death
Henry Popham, Esq. died 17 June 1418, and was buried at St Thomas's church, Lymington, Hampshire. He left a will dated 6 November 1417, proved 22 June 1418.

Marriages
He married (1st), before Easter term 1376 (date of lawsuit), to Joan, granddaughter and co-heiress of John Aucher, of Bickton (in Fordingbridge), Hampshire and Fisherton Anger, Wiltshire, by whom he had one son, Stephen. 

He married (2nd), Margaret, widow of Richard Mewes, of Long Barnes (in Beauchamp Roding), Essex, and daughter of John James, of Rush Court (in Wallingford), Berkshire, by Christine, daughter of John Anesty. They had one son, John. His widow, Margaret, died 11 June 1448.

References

1340s births
1418 deaths
People from Basingstoke and Deane
High Sheriffs of Hampshire
Henry
English MPs 1385
English MPs February 1383
Year of birth uncertain
English MPs September 1388
English MPs November 1390
English MPs 1394
English MPs October 1404
English MPs February 1388
English justices of the peace